Cell cycle regulator of non-homologous end joining is a protein that in humans is encoded by the CYREN gene.

It prevents classical non-homologous end joining, a method of repair of double-stranded DNA breaks. This protein is therefore important in regulating DNA repair.

When alternatively spliced, is predicted to produce three different micropeptides.
 MRI-1 was previously found to be a modulator of retrovirus infection.
 MRI-2 may be important in non-homologous end joining (NHEJ) of DNA double strand breaks. In Co-Immunoprecipitation experiments, MRI-2 bound to Ku70 and Ku80, two subunits of Ku, which play a major role in the NHEJ pathway.
MRI-3

References 

DNA repair